Haizhou or Hai Prefecture (海州) was a zhou (prefecture) in imperial China seated in modern Lianyungang, Jiangsu, China. It existed (intermittently) from 549 to 1912.

During the Yuan dynasty it was briefly named Haizhou Route (海州路).

The modern Haizhou District in Lianyungang City retains its name.

Geography
The administrative region of Haizhou in the Tang dynasty is in modern Jiangsu. It probably includes parts of modern: 
 Under the administration of Lianyungang:
Lianyungang
Donghai County
Guanyun County
Under the administration of Suqian:
Shuyang County

References
 

Prefectures of the Sui dynasty
Prefectures of the Tang dynasty
Prefectures of the Song dynasty
Prefectures of Yang Wu
Prefectures of Southern Tang
Prefectures of Later Zhou
Prefectures of the Jin dynasty (1115–1234)
Former prefectures in Jiangsu
Prefectures of the Yuan dynasty
Subprefectures of the Ming dynasty